Marija Erić (Serbian Cyrillic: Марија Ерић, born May 2, 1983, in Belgrade, SFR Yugoslavia) is a Serbian female basketball player. She plays point guard position.

External links
Profile at fibaeurope.com
Profile at eurobasket.com

1983 births
Living people
Basketball players from Belgrade
Point guards
Serbian expatriate basketball people in Italy
Serbian expatriate basketball people in Russia
Serbian women's basketball players
ŽKK Crvena zvezda players
ŽKK Vojvodina players